Ramalinopsis is a genus of lichenized fungi in the family Ramalinaceae. This is a monotypic genus, containing the single species Ramalinopsis mannii.

References

Ramalinaceae
Lichen genera
Lecanorales genera